John Stock (July 5, 1918 – June 29, 1972) is a bishop of the Catholic Church in the United States.  He served as the Auxiliary Bishop of Ukrainian Catholic Archeparchy of Philadelphia from 1971 to 1972.

Biography
Born in St. Clair, Pennsylvania, Stock was ordained a priest for the Archeparchy of Philadelphia on December 4, 1943.  Pope Paul VI named him as the Titular Bishop of Pergamum and Auxiliary Bishop of Philadelphia (Ukrainian) on January 11, 1971.  He was ordained a bishop by Archbishop Ambrozij Andrew Senyshyn, O.S.B.M. on May 25, 1971.  The principal co-consecrators were Bishops Jaroslav Gabro of Chicago and Michael Dudick of the Byzantine Catholic Eparchy of Passaic.  He died the following year on June 29, 1972 at the age of 53.

References

1918 births
1972 deaths
People from St. Clair, Pennsylvania
Bishops of the Ukrainian Greek Catholic Church
American Eastern Catholic bishops
20th-century Eastern Catholic bishops
20th-century American clergy